This list covers all known stars, brown dwarfs, and sub-brown dwarfs within  of the Sun. So far, 131 such objects have been found, of which only 22 are bright enough to be visible without a telescope. The visible light needs to reach or exceed the dimmest brightness to be visible to the naked eye from Earth, 6.5 apparent magnitude.

The known 131 objects are bound in 94 stellar systems. Of those, 103 are main sequence stars: 80 red dwarfs and 23 "typical" stars having greater mass. Additionally, astronomers have found 6 white dwarfs (stars that have exhausted all fusible hydrogen), 21 brown dwarfs, as well as 1 sub-brown dwarf, WISE 0855−0714 (possibly a rogue planet). The closest system is Alpha Centauri, with Proxima Centauri as the closest star in that system, at 4.2465 light-years from Earth. The brightest, most massive and most luminous object among those 131 is Sirius A, which is also the brightest star in Earth's night sky; its white dwarf companion Sirius B is the hottest object among them. The largest object within the 20 light-years is Procyon.

It contains Ursa Major and the Hyades star cluster, among others. The Local Bubble also contains the neighboring G-Cloud, which contains the stars Alpha Centauri and Altair. In the galactic context, the Local Bubble is a small part of the Orion Arm, which contains most stars that we can see without a telescope. The Orion arm is one of the spiral arms of our Milky Way galaxy.

Astrometrics

The easiest way to determine stellar distance to the Sun for objects at these distances is parallax, which measures how much stars appear to move against background objects over the course of Earth's orbit around the Sun. As a parsec (parallax-second) is defined by the distance of an object that would appear to move exactly one second of arc against background objects, stars less than 5 parsecs away will have measured parallaxes of over 0.2 arcseconds, or 200 milliarcseconds. Determining past and future positions relies on accurate astrometric measurements of their parallax and total proper motions (how far they move across the sky due to their actual velocity relative to the Sun), along with spectroscopically determined radial velocities (their speed directly towards or away from us, which combined with proper motion defines their true movement through the sky relative to the Sun). Both of these measurements are subject to increasing and significant errors over very long time spans, especially over the several thousand-year time spans it takes for stars to noticeably move relative to each other.

Based on results from the Gaia telescope's second data release from April 2018, an estimated 694 stars will approach the Solar System to less than 5 parsecs in the next 15 million years. Of these, 26 have a good probability to come within  and another 7 within . This number is likely much higher, due to the sheer number of stars needed to be surveyed; a star approaching the Solar System 10 million years ago, moving at a typical Sun-relative 20–200 kilometers per second, would be 600–6,000 light-years from the Sun at present day, with millions of stars closer to the Sun. The closest encounter to the Sun so far predicted is the low-mass orange dwarf star Gliese 710 / HIP 89825 with roughly 60% the mass of the Sun. It is currently predicted to pass  from the Sun in  million years from the present, close enough to significantly disturb the Solar System's Oort cloud.

List

The classes of the stars and brown dwarfs are shown in the color of their spectral types (these colors are derived from conventional names for the spectral types and do not necessarily represent the star's observed color). Many brown dwarfs are not listed by visual magnitude but are listed by near-infrared J band apparent magnitude due to how dim (and often invisible) they are in visible color bands (U, B or V). Absolute magnitude (with electromagnetic wave, 'light' band denoted in subscript) is a measurement at a 10-parsec distance across imaginary empty space devoid of all its sparse dust and gas. Some of the parallaxes and resultant distances are rough measurements.

Distant future and past encounters

Over long periods of time, the slow independent motion of stars change in both relative position and in their distance from the observer. This can cause other currently distant stars to fall within a stated range, which may be readily calculated and predicted using accurate astrometric measurements of parallax and total proper motions, along with spectroscopically determined radial velocities. Although predictions can be extrapolated back into the past or forward into the future, they are subject to increasing significant cumulative errors over very long periods. Inaccuracies of these measured parameters make determining the true minimum distances of any encountering stars or brown dwarfs fairly difficult.

One of the first stars known to approach the Sun particularly close is Gliese 710. The star, whose mass is roughly half that of the Sun, is currently 62 light-years from the Solar System.

The second-closest object known to approach the Sun was only discovered in 2018 after Gaia second data release, known as 2MASS J0610-4246. Its approach has not been fully described due to it being a distant binary star with a red dwarf, but almost certainly passed less than 1 light-year from the Solar System roughly 1.16 million years ago.

Gaia third data release has provided updated values for many of the candidates in the table below.

See also

 Interstellar travel
 Location of Earth
 The Magnificent Seven
 Nearby Stars Database
 Solar System#Galactic context
 Stars and planetary systems in fiction

Related lists

 List of stars with resolved images
 List of brightest stars
 List of star systems within 20–25 light-years
 List of star systems within 25–30 light-years
 List of star systems within 30–35 light-years
 List of star systems within 35–40 light-years
 List of star systems within 40–45 light-years
 List of star systems within 45–50 light-years
 List of nearest bright stars
 Historical brightest stars
 List of nearest exoplanets
 List of nearest terrestrial exoplanet candidates
 List of nearest free floating planetary mass objects
 List of nearby stellar associations and moving groups
 List of star-forming regions in the Local Group
 Lists of stars
 List of Solar System objects by greatest aphelion
 List of trans-Neptunian objects

Notes

References

External links
"The 100 nearest star systems", Research Consortium on Nearby Stars 

The dynamics of the closest stars

Nearest Stars 3D View
Table 4 "The Census of Stars and Brown Dwarfs within 8 Parsecs of the Sun" in 

nearest stars and brown dwarfs
Local Bubble
nearest stars and brown dwarfs
Articles containing video clips
nearest stars and brown dwarfs